is a former Japanese football player.

Playing career
Sunakawa was born in Narashino on August 10, 1977. After graduating from high school, he joined his local club Kashiwa Reysol in 1996. On June 1, he debuted in J.League Cup against Urawa Reds. However he could only play this match until 1998. From 1999, he played many matches as offensive midfielder and the club won the champions 1999 J.League Cup. The club also won the 3rd place in 1999 and 2000 J1 League. However his opportunity to play decreased in 2002. In 2003, he moved to newly was relegated to J2 League club, Consadole Sapporo. He became a regular player as offensive midfielder and the club won the champions in 2007. In 2008, although the club played in J1 League, finished at bottom place and was relegated to J2 in a year. From 2009, he lost his regular position behind young player Seiya Fujita and Hiroki Miyazawa. However he played many matches and the club was promoted to J1 in 2012. He also became a first player who played for more than 10 years in club history. Although the club was relegated to J2 in a year, he played many matches until 2014. In 2015, he could not play at all in the match for injury. In July 2015, he moved to FC Gifu and he retired end of 2015 season.

Club statistics

References

External links

1977 births
Living people
People from Narashino
Association football people from Chiba Prefecture
Japanese footballers
J1 League players
J2 League players
Kashiwa Reysol players
Hokkaido Consadole Sapporo players
FC Gifu players
Association football midfielders